The Bydgoszcz Academy of Music is a Polish state music university located in downtown Bydgoszcz. Its origins date back to 1974, as Branch of the High School of Music in Łódź  till 1979. From 1979 to 1981, it was established as Bydgoszcz State Higher School of Music, comprising for four departments. Since 1981, it is called Academy of Music – "Feliks Nowowiejski".

Patron 
Since December 1, 1981, the patron of the music university is Feliks Nowowiejski (1877–1946), a Polish composer, conductor, teacher, organist and virtuoso.

Living in Poznań since 1919, Feliks Nowowiejski repeatedly visited Bydgoszcz in the interwar period as a conductor and composer. On April 3, 1921, he conducted in Bydgoszcz the local choir "Halka" in a room on Torunska street, and on November 18, 1923, he led a concert in the Seminar Building on the occasion of the 5th anniversary of Polish independence. One of the large-scale event he attended was the unveiling of the Monument to Henryk Sienkiewicz in Bydgoszcz, the first at the time in Poland, on July 31, 1927. During the ceremony, in the presence of President of Poland Ignacy Mościcki, Feliks Nowowiejski conducted a solemn concert performed by the orchestra of the 68th Infantry Regiment and combined choirs of Bydgoszcz and Poznań.

History

Pre-war traditions 

Institutionalized teaching traditions for future artists and musicians started in the city here at the beginning of the 20th century. Prior to this time, music teaching habits developed already, in the building of the parochial school as well as schools of the Carmelite Monastery (now defunct, at the location of the Theatre square) and the Jesuit College (now the city hall).

In 1904, Arnold Schattschneider (a conductor) and Wilhelm von Winterfeld (a violinist, conductor and composer) founded the Bromberg Conservatory of Music, at Adam Mickiewicz Alley 9, which performed its activities until 1945.

After the restoration of the Second Polish Republic, Bydgoszcz started to develop music education. Main elements of this movement in the years 1925–1927, were the Municipal Institute of Music and the Municipal Conservatory of Music, founded in 1927 by Zdzislaw Jahnke, a professor in Poznań Conservatory. The Jahnke conservatory, like the German Conservatory of von Winterfefd, led teaching music at three levels (lower, middle and higher-academic), and the structure of the school consisted of 8 departments (singing, piano, orchestral instruments, liturgical music, pipe organ, group music, pedagogical seminar, music theory and other additional subjects).

During interwar period, the Municipal Conservatory of Music raised as the leading music school in the city, thanks to the quality of the pedagogical team: among them was Józef Paderewski (1871–1958), brother of Ignacy Jan Paderewski. Bydgoszcz conservatories trained many respected musicians and music educators, including Alfons Rezler (conductor, founder of the Municipal Symphony Orchestra in 1938) and Marta Suchecka (violinist, educator).

During the Nazi occupation, the Municipal Conservatory of Music has been converted into a German school. Von Winterfeld Conservatory of Music ceased its activities in 1944, after the death of its Director.

Post-war attempts (1945–1974) 

After the end of World War II, the process of rebuilding a music education system in the city started over. The Municipal Conservatory of Music resumed its activities, in its own building at Gdańsk Street 71. The school kept its instruments and an almost its complete teaching staff. However, within the new socio-political education system, the Conservatory was soon nationalized. As a result, and several years later, emerged the Primary Music School and the State Secondary School of Music.

Although since 1946, Bydgoszcz put efforts to have a Music University created, ministerial decisions only established an Academy of Music in Gdańsk. In parallel, in the 1950s, several musical institutions were established in Bydgoszcz:
 Pomeranian Philharmonic;
 Opera Studio;
 First and Second degree Music schools.
This movement intensified the needs of a local environment regarding higher musical education, as regularly advocated in the 1960s by Andrzej Szwalbe, director of the Pomeranian Philharmonic and Konrad Palubicki, professor of the national State Academy of Music in Gdańsk.

Branch of the Academy of Music in Łódź (1974–1979) 
The efforts to set up in Bydgoszcz a Music Academy found the support of the central government in July 1974. This approval allowed the rector of the Academy of Music in Łódź, Zenon Ploszaj, to establish on the 1st October 1974, in Bydgoszcz, a branch of Lódz Music.

On October 1, 1975, first classes began with 25 students of the Instrumental Faculty, led by Deputy Dean and manager of the academy, Miroslaw Pietkiewicz. Initially, the classes were conducted in the halls of the Pomeranian Philharmonic and the Music School, and lectures performed by professors coming from Lódz. Part of the staff comprised also musicians from the Pomeranian Symphony Orchestra and Capella Bydgostiensis, the Chamber music ensemble.

In 1976, a Musical Education department was created and the academy moved into its main building, provided by Voivodeship at Slowackiego street 7, which still remains today its headquarters.

In April 1979, students got their own lodgings at Libelta street 14, thanks to the great help provided by Andrzej Szwalbe, then director of the Pomeranian Philharmonic. Between 1977 and 1979, a major took place at Slowackiego street 7 so as to adapt interiors to the needs of musical teaching. In September 1979, the building housed a national congress of art schools rectors.

State High School of Music in Bydgoszcz (1979–1981) 
On November 27, 1979, Polish Council of Ministers created in Bydgoszcz a State High School of Music, independent from the Academy of Music in Łódź. Its first rector was Roman Suchecki.

Soon in 1980, the university reached its full working structure, similar to other music schools in the country, with the creation of two new departments: Composition-Theory of Music and Vocal-Acting. The same year has been established in the Instrumental Department an Extramural Studies capability and an Instrumental Recording Studio.

The academic year 1979/1980 welcomed 120 students, crowned by a tour of the Academic Symphony Orchestra, composed of university pupils.

Music Academy of Bydgoszcz (since 1981) 
On December 1, 1981, the university was renamed Academy of Music "Feliks Nowowiejski", completing its integration among the other Polish Academies of Music. The motto of the university Musica spiritus movens (Music moves spirit) has been then placed at the front of the building beside a crowned eagle.

In the 1980s, effort was put into training teachers and creating research units, to replace the initial pedagogic staff, essentially composed of teachers commuting from Łódź , Poznań, Gdańsk, Warsaw or Kraków. The local teaching team was in place in the 1990s.
Gradually new departments and positions have been established:
 Piano, String Instruments, Chamber Music Ensembles and Conducting (1982);
 Choirmaster Postgraduate (1984);
 Departments of Music Theory, Composition and Foreign Languages Study (1987);
 School Vocal Postgraduate (1989);
 Laboratory of Musical Culture of Pomerania and Kujawy (1990);
 Chair of Wind Instruments (1991);
 University publishing house (1992);
 Pedagogical Studies (1994);
 Instrumental Studies Postgraduate (1999);
 Laboratory of Church Music (2003); 
 Vocal Studies Postgraduate (2004);
 Interdisciplinary Department of Jazz and Popular Music (2008).

In 1983, a building dedicated to educational purposes and student accommodation has been bought, located at Staszica street 7, at the corner with Kołłątaja street. In 1989, with the delivery of the new concert hall, university authorities renewed a majority of the musical equipment: first-class concert Steinway & Sons pianos, chordophones, pipe organs, wind instruments, percussion instruments.
In 1996, the school obtained full autonomy, including the acquisition of the rights to carry out doctoral curricula in the field of art.

From 1974 to 1999, 1127 students have been graduated from the academy. Between 2002 and 2009, the number of university teachers increased from 120 to 150, including 55 professors, and the number of students raised by 60% to 552 from 2002 to 2015.

In 2007, the academy received in charge the historic building of the Pomeranian Arts House (built in 1887), previously run by the Opera Nova Bydgoszcz authorities. After a series of overhaul works, including a 2009 European investment projects fund, the modernization of the facility has been carried out to fit the edifice to teaching purposes, comprising the restoration of the concert hall and the 19th century facade.

The strategic objective set by the board of the Academy of Music is to increase the number of professors, as well as the capacity to deliver doctoral degrees, so as to give a more important dimension to the university.

In 2019, the city authorities launched a project to erect a new building for the Music Academy – "Feliks Nowowiejski", at 9-11 Chodkiewicza street.

Curricula 
Bydgoszcz Academy of Music comprises four faculties, teaching also the following musical fields:
 Animators for musical activities;
 Symphony orchestra and choir conducting;
 Training music teachers and sound directors.

The curriculum unravels from the First degree, leading to a Licentiate diploma or a second cycle studies, conferring the title of Master's degree of Arts.

In 2008, a PhD-third cycle has been created in the Instrumental Department, in addition to the possibility of postgraduating in one of the four faculties. Since 2010, the academy can award the degree of Doctor in musical instrument and conducting, and possess a doctor habilitation.

Under bilateral agreements, the academy regularly cooperates with schools abroad, such as:

"Feliks Nowowiejski" Academy of music of Bydgoszcz is also a regular partner of the Erasmus Programme.

Departments and structure 
The school is divided in four faculties: 
 Faculty of Instrumental Music;
 Faculty of Composition, Theory of Music and Sound Engineering;
 Faculty of Vocal Music and Drama;
 Faculty of Conducting, Jazz Music and Music Education.

It also developed cross-departments curricula: 
 Pedagogy;
 Foreign Languages;
 Early Music;
 Contemporary Music;
 Jazz and Popular Music;
 Piano Chamber Music
 Recording Studio and Music library.

Academy facilities 
All buildings are located in Bydgoszcz downtown, within the so-called Music District of Bydgoszcz.

Main building 

The academy moved into its main seat in 1975, located at Slowackiego street 7. Together with Pomeranian Philharmonic and the building of the Music Schools Group, they form a network surrounding the Jan Kochanowski Park where is displayed a gallery of sculptures related to composers and virtuosos.

Other places 
A 90-bed capacity is offered to students, with several buildings. One is located at Staszica street 3 and Staszica street 7 (at the corner with Kołłątaja street).
The other tenement stands nearby the Pomeranian Philharmonic building at Szwalbego Street 4.

Other teaching facilities include a tenement at Warminskiego Street 13 and the Pomeranian Arts House at Gdańska Street 20.

Altogether, these buildings offer a total capacity of:
 14 rooms for collective lectures;
 42 rooms for individual lessons;
 a pipe organ practice hall; 
 a music library;
 an auditorium with 100 seats (at Staszica street 3);
 a concert hall for 140 seats in the main building of the academy.

A project for the construction of a new Music Academy building complex is currently ongoing, into order to gather all these scattered facilities in one place. An architectural competition should pick out the best project to be erected by 2020 on an abandoned green areas between streets Kamienna, Chodkiewicza and Gdańska Street.

Artistic activities 
In addition to teaching and research activities, the Music Academy conducts a large-scale artistic activity, radiating through the whole Kujawy-Pomerania.

The university houses:
 two choirs (one Academic, one chamber music choir);
 an academic Symphony Orchestra (est. 1976);
 an ensemble of ancient music;
 numerous ensemble for chamber music and for soloists.

Regularly, concerts are organized or co-organized by the academy where ensembles attend recurrent regional events.

On both stages of the university are regularly held concerts and opera performances with the participation of students, teachers and guests. Some are regular events listed in Bydgoszcz calendar of cultural events, such as:
 Bydgoskie Tuesdays Music – , (since 1981). Held once a month in the Concert Hall of the university;
 Pipe organ Thursdays – , (since 1992). Held every other month in the Concert Hall of the academy;
 Musical Mornings – , (since 1994). A monthly cycle for children;
 Palace Concerts, organized every month in Lubostron Palace;
 Academic Concerts (since 2002). Held every other month in Ostromecko Palace and co-organized by Bydgoszcz Municipal Cultural Centre;
 Student Workshop Opera;
 Great Cycles – ;
 The Music Academy in City Monuments.

Student ensemble or soloists attend festivals and music competitions, at regional, national and international levels, among others:
 International Piano Competition "Ignacy Jan Paderewski";
 Festival of Music Competition Laureates (since 1994);
 International Choral Meetings "Arti et Amicitiae" (1994–1998);
 Forte Piano, Student Festival (1994–1999);
 Festival of Young Organists and Vocalists "Jerzy Popieluszko", held since 1996 at the Church of the Holy Trinity in Bydgoszcz;
 Singing Competition "I. J. Paderewski" (since 1999);
 Organ Evenings, held since 2001 at the Saint Andrew Bobola's Church in Bydgoszcz.

The cultural activity of the academy ranks third in the musical institution production of the city, after Opera Nova and the Pomeranian Philharmonic.

Research 
Primary field of research is science of music, comprising theory, history of music, history of performances and practice and local music culture.

Scientific research is mostly carried out during regularly organized sessions and academic conferences, but also through individual studies and team projects. Between 1980 and 2004 the Academy of Music has organized 31 conferences, with topics related mainly to classical music and traditional music in Kujawy and Pomerania. 
 
The results of the research are published in monographs published by the academy and publications of other academic centers from Poland and abroad. In particular, one can notice the work concerning musical life of Kujawy and Pomerania, as well as a series of musical scores called "Composers scores of Bydgoszcz".

Pomerania and Kujawy Workshop of Musical Culture 
Since 1990, the Laboratory Research of the university focuses on regional themes. It involves collecting and documenting data regarding musical culture in Kujawy and Pomerania and setting-up of scientific sessions devoted to this subject.

Their product is reflected in an annual scientific journal, representing an overview of musical life in different periods, from the Old Polish days to contemporary times.

Notable personages

List of rectors 
 1975–1979, Dr. Miroslaw Pietkiewicz, director of Academy of Music in Łódź, vice-rector of Bydgoszcz Branch from October 1977;
 1979–1980, Professor Zenon Ploszaj, violinist;
 1980–1987, Dr. Roman Suchecki, cellist; 
 1987–1993, Professor Franciszek Wozniak, composer and pianist; 
 1993–1999, Professor Dr. Antoni Poszowski, music theorist;
 1999–2005, Professor Jerzy Kaszuba, accordionist;
 2005–2012, Professor Maria Murawska, pianist;
 2012–2020, Professor Jerzy Kaszuba, accordionist;
 Since 200, Professor Elżbieta Wtorkowska, music director.

Doctors Honoris Causa 
 Professor Jerzy Godziszewski, pianist, on November 27, 2007;
 Đặng Thái Sơn, pianist, on April 27, 2010;
 Professor Mieczysław Tomaszewski, musicologist, on May 28, 2010.

Notable alumni 
Notable former students and alumni of Bydgoszcz Music Academy "Feliks Nowowiejski" include:
 Rafał Blechacz, winner in 2005 of the 15th International Chopin Piano Competition;
 Paweł Wakarecy, finalist in 2010 of the 16th International Chopin Piano Competition, being the only Pole reaching this stage; 
 Krzysztof Herdzin, pianist, composer, arranger, conductor, record producer, multi-instrumentalist (piano, double bass, violin), winner of several national and international music competitions.

See also 

 Bydgoszcz
 Main building of Bydgoszcz Music Academy
 Music Schools Group in Bydgoszcz
 Opera Nova Bydgoszcz
 Pomeranian Philharmonic
 Gdańska Street in Bydgoszcz
 Kołłątaja street in Bydgoszcz
 Pomeranian Arts House in Bydgoszcz
 Szwalbego Street in Bydgoszcz
 Słowackiego Street in Bydgoszcz

References

External links
 Bydgoszcz Academy of Music

Bibliography 
 
  
  
  
  
  
  
 
 
  
 

Education in Bydgoszcz
Music schools in Poland
Cultural heritage monuments in Bydgoszcz
Music
Educational institutions established in 1974
1974 establishments in Poland